Hodges Glacier is a small glacier  west of Grytviken, South Georgia, flowing from the south side of Petrel Peak to the foot of Mount Hodges. The name was recommended by the UK Antarctic Place-Names Committee and derives from association with Mount Hodges.

See also
 List of glaciers in the Antarctic
 Glaciology

References

Glaciers of South Georgia